Paul Gow (born 27 May 1969) is a former Australian rules footballer who played seven games for Footscray in the Australian Football League (AFL) in 1991.

From Perth, Western Australia, Gow attended Guildford Grammar School, and was recruited from the Swan Districts Football Club in the West Australian Football League (WAFL) with the 8th selection in the 1990 AFL Draft. He had been a member of Swan Districts' 1990 WAFL premiership team. At the end of the 1991 season he was traded back to Western Australia, to play for the West Coast Eagles. However he couldn't break into the powerful Eagles side, and played his only game for the club in a preseason practice match. He continued to play for Swans, playing a total of 78 games, before he left the club following a dispute in 1994.

References

External links

1969 births
Australian rules footballers from Perth, Western Australia
Living people
People educated at Guildford Grammar School
Sportsmen from Western Australia
Swan Districts Football Club players
Western Bulldogs players